Isabel Behncke Izquierdo is a field ethologist who studies animal behaviour to understand other animals, as well as to understand humans and our place in nature. Originally from Chile, she is a primatologist, a pioneer adventurer-scientist and the first South American in following great apes in the wild.

Education
Behncke has a BSc in Zoology and an MSc in Wildlife Conservation from University College London, an MPhil in Human Evolution from Cambridge and a DPhil in Evolutionary Anthropology from Oxford.

Career
She walked more than 3,000 km following wild bonobos (Pan paniscus) in the Congo jungle. Her PhD for Oxford University was the first comprehensive study of play behaviour in wild bonobos known to science.

Behncke applies an evolutionary lens to derive insights into human behaviour and the modern challenges that humanity and the planet face. Her focus in studying play in non-human primates has been to shed light on the role of play in our own development, as humans are one of the few species that play during adulthood. For Dr Behncke, play is at the root of creativity, social bonding and healthy development.

 she is an Academic Collaborator of the Research Centre in Social Complexity (CICS) in Universidad del Desarrollo, Santiago, Chile; a Fellow of the Bay Area-based Gruter Institute for Interdisciplinary Research on Human Behavior & Institutions; and Visiting Researcher at Robin Dunbar's Social Neuroscience Evolutionary Research Group (SNRG) at University of Oxford.

Conservation of Temperate Rainforests

As Director of Huilo-Huilo Foundation, she was part of the emerging private conservation movement of the early 2000s. At 60,000 square km, Huilo-Huilo is a private for profit natural reserve and ecotourism project in southern Chile. For this work, she lived in the field (years 2001-2004), near the shores of Northern Patagonia's Pirihueico Lake with her parrot Tuk. With the aim of enhancing ecosystem resilience Behncke was part of a group of people who were pioneering social and ecosystem integration through the creation of biodiversity corridors and habitat conservation. She worked with organizations such as Senda Darwin and Parques para Chile, and international wilderness conservation Planet Heritage Foundation.

Wild bonobo research 
Bonobos, together with chimpanzees, are our living closest relatives. Yet they are the least known of apes. They are highly endangered and live only south of the river Congo in the tropical jungles of DRC. Bonobos are unusual in that they are highly sexual, peaceful, and have a matriarchy where non-related females bond strongly with each other. They, like humans, play throughout their lives. It appears that the regular experience of social fun is core to developing and maintaining bonobo cohesive societies.
Isabel has highlighted the importance of the role of females in animal societies not just in bonobos but also in other species such as elephants 
Isabel worked at Wamba, Luo Reserve, the world's longest running bonobo research site, run by Japanese scientists of Kyoto University. Wamba has survived a number of political upheavals in the region. Chronic bloodshed in Congo meant that at the time of her study Isabel was the first western person in more than 20 years to do bonobo research at Wamba.

Burning Man and ethology in festivals 
Behncke highlights how social gatherings are a natural and fundamental part of our lives as highly social animals. Doing human ethology at festivals like Burning Man in the desert or Carnival in Brazil, she has studied how the function of parties isn't for excessive indulgence; rather, parties enable social and economic interaction and integrate and build our social complexity

Applied human sciences 
Isabel Behncke has developed a style of knowledge integration that she applies to current human issues. She uses evolutionary, behavioural and ecological sciences to derive principles relevant to the capacity to adapt to change both of individuals and organisations. She is often an invited guest to teach and participate in think-tanks issues that require trans-disciplinary approaches, such as the future of cities as social habitats, depression and mental health, behavioural economics and engagement or how to design rituals for organizational change

Other activities
Isabel studies play as an ethologist and as a direct participant to gain insights on creativity, collaboration, and well-being. In NYC she took up Improv and did a TED Residency talk on the parallels of the creative process of nature and those arising by the rules of improv, titled 'Does nature have a sense of humour?'
Isabel has been avid traveller all her life, and enjoys music, wilderness, large dogs, horses, mountains, and connecting people and ideas.

Patagonia expeditions and history of exploration 
Isabel often participates and co-leads expeditions to Patagonia, highlighting its wild nature as well as its role in the history of exploration.
In collaboration with Congreso Futuro in January 2017 she took a group of scientists including Richard Dawkins on board the world's only 1:1 replica of HMS Beagle, the ship that took Captain FitzRoy and Charles Darwin around the world, and from whose journey the Origin of Species was eventually born.

Public speaking

In 2011 she was a TED Fellow and gave a talk "Evolution's gift of play, from bonobo apes to humans".

TED main event, 2017, Español session 'Why we party?', on the natural history of human festivals.

TEDx BRC 2014 and TEDx BRC 2016 (together with Esther Perel).

Behncke has delivered keynote plenaries at stages as diverse as the Gruter Institute, SUMMIT LA, and Aspen Circles. Other speaking invitations include the United Nations General Assembly NYC, Google Zeitgeist, House of Lords London, SXSW, WIRED, G20, as well as academic meetings such as Human Evolution and Behaviour Society (HBES) and Human Ethology (ISHE).

Radio, film & TV

Radio 
In October 2013 she appeared on BBC Radio 4's The Museum of Curiosity. Her hypothetical donation to this fictional museum was "a laughing tree", a tree in which Bonobos congregated and laughed such that the tree itself seemed to laugh.

NPR TED Hour ('Play, social health and Burning Man').
Podcasts: Mating Grounds with Geoffrey Miller and Tuker Max

Documentaries 
´Animals in Love' (BBC), Ape Man (National Geographic), ´Animals At Play´ (BBC, 2019) and Independent film ´Bounce: How the ball taught the world to play´.

Prizes and awards
ENEL Premio Energía Mujer (2018) (National recognition for women for commitment to social and cultural developments)
Chilenos Sin Frontera (2017) (Initiative that recognizes 30 Chilean talents who are innovating in various disciplines)

10 Chileans who are changing the world (2017) (1-hr homage documentary produced by the Chilean public television broadcaster TVN)
100 Women Leaders by El Mercurio newspaper (2012) (National recognition for a group of women for their contributions in science, innovation and academic trajectory)
100 Young Leaders by El Mercurio newspaper (2010) (National recognition for a group of young promising talents)

The work of Isabel has also been featured in publications highlighting female achievement and women in science

Other honors
TED Fellowship (2011)
TED Residency, Inaugural class Spring 2016, at TED HQ in Soho, NYC.

Selected publications

References

External links
 
  (2011)
 https://blog.nationalgeographic.org/2015/02/12/essay-human-females-could-should-be-more-like-elephant-females/
Planet Heritage

Year of birth missing (living people)
Living people
Chilean mammalogists
Women primatologists
Primatologists
Chilean women scientists
Alumni of University College London
Alumni of the University of Oxford
Alumni of the University of Cambridge
Academic staff of the University for Development